Steffens may refer to:

 Lincoln Steffens (1866–1936), New York reporter.
 Maggie Steffens (born 1993), American water polo player.
 Jessica Steffens (born 1987), American water polo player.
 Henrik Steffens (1773–1845), Norwegian-born Danish philosopher.
 Dirk Steffens (born 1950), a German musician.
 Bradley Steffens (born 1955), American author.

Surnames from given names